First Choice Liquor is a group of liquor superstores in Australia owned by Coles Group, and competes principally with the Endeavour Group owned Dan Murphy's chain as a big-box retailer in the takeaway liquor market.

First Choice Liquor grew out of the former Quaffers brand, and sits alongside Liquorland and Vintage Cellars, Coles' other liquor brands. The first store was opened in May 2005 at Tooronga Village in Melbourne. Expansion of the chain was assisted with then owner Coles Group purchasing the Queensland-based Hedley Hotel chain and Mr Corks Liquor Group in 2006. The chain comprised 93 stores as of May 2018.  An ultra-discount no-frills banner of Wesfarmers, called Liquor Market (with a 'yellow water/beer drop' logo) had experimented with about half a dozen stores in Melbourne, then Sydney, however, the brand name failed to gain major traction, thus, they have been merged '1st Choice Liquor Market' since 2019 after Coles Group was divest from Wesfarmers, with many 'First Choice' stores switching from their traditional blue theme and signage to the yellow colouring.

References

External links
First Choice Liquor

Alcohol distribution retailers in Australia
Coles Group
Retail companies established in 2005
Australian companies established in 2005
Wine_retailers